Subhuman/Something Came Over Me is a single by Throbbing Gristle.

The single was simultaneously released with Adrenalin/Distant Dreams (Part Two). Like most of TG's artwork, the Center labels featured distinct insignia typical of the band, with no "Death Factory" logo like other singles. The Message "White Stains" was scratched into the B-side. The cover sleeve is a black and white reproduction of "The Apotheosis of War" by Vasili Vasilyevich Vereshchagin.

Track listing
Side A:
"Subhuman" – 2:53
Side B:
"Something Came Over Me" – 3:43

Charts

References

External links
Discogs entry

1980 singles
Throbbing Gristle songs
1980 songs